Meditation (subtitle: Aspect of Toshiko Akiyoshi Quartet) is a jazz album by pianist Toshiko Akiyoshi and her quartet, recorded in Tokyo in late February 1971 and released in Japan by Dan Records.

Track listing
Side 'A'
"What Now My Love" (Bécaud, Delanoë, Sigman) – 11:55
"Stella by Starlight" (Young, Washington) – 10:35
Side 'B'
"Willow Weep for Me" (Ronell) – 6:20
"Straight, No Chaser" (Monk) – 10:16
"Meditation" (Jobim, Mendonça) – 7:50
Same track order on re-issue except the positions of "Meditation" and "What Now My Love" are reversed.

Personnel
Toshiko Akiyoshi – piano
Lew Tabackin – tenor saxophone, flute
Lyn Christie – bass
Albert Heath – drums

References / External Links
Minorufon VC-6001,
Tokuma/Dan VC-7513

Toshiko Akiyoshi albums
1971 albums